Penfold Point is a point which forms the northwest side of the entrance to Whalers Bay, Deception Island, in the South Shetland Islands. Named for Lieutenant Commander D.N. Penfold, Royal Navy, who conducted a survey of the island during 1948–49.

Headlands of the South Shetland Islands
Geography of Deception Island